Dihammaphora uncinata' is a species of beetle in the family Cerambycidae. It was described by Napp and Mermudes in 2010.

References

Dihammaphora
Beetles described in 2010